Mikkel Møller Lassen (born 19 June 2001) is a Danish professional footballer who plays for AC Horsens.

Club career
Lassen is a product of the AGF youth system, joining the club as a 11-year-old in 2013 from his hometown club Odder IGF. He was the team captain from under-14 through under-19 levels. In 2017, he signed a three-year youth contract with AGF.

In 2019, he began training with the first team. He made his official debut for AGF on 11 September 2019, when Jesper Juelsgård was injured during the warm-up for the Danish Cup match against the Funen Series team Marstal/Rise. AGF trailed 2–0, but won 2–6 after extra time. On 7 October 2019, he extended his contract with AGF until the summer of 2024. The contract replaced the previous youth contract the following summer, and at the same time he also became a permanent part of the club's first-team squad.

On 4 October 2020, Lassen made his Danish Superliga debut for AGF when he was substituted in the final minutes of the match – a match that ended in a 1–1 draw against AaB.

On 1 February 2021, Lassen moved on loan to Skive IK until the end of the season. On 1 September 2021, Lassen was loaned out again, this time to AC Horsens until the end of 2021.

On 7 December 2021, following 13 appearances in all competitions during his loan deal at AC Horsens, Lassen signed a permanent deal making him a Horsens player from 1 January 2022.

References

External links
Mikkel Lassen at DBU

Living people
2001 births
Danish men's footballers
Denmark youth international footballers
Association football defenders
Odder IGF players
Aarhus Gymnastikforening players
Skive IK players
AC Horsens players
Danish Superliga players
Danish 1st Division players